J. C. U. Niedermann (born 1810) was an America brickmaker who served one year as a National Union Party member of the Wisconsin State Assembly from the 5th Milwaukee County assembly district (the 5th Ward of the city of Milwaukee, Wisconsin) in 1864, succeeding Democrat Peter V. Deuster. He also served as a constable, and on the Milwaukee Common Council and the Milwaukee County board of supervisors at various times in the late 1850s and early 1860s.

He was born in Germany. At the time of his election he was 54 years old and had been in Wisconsin for 28 years. He was assigned to the standing committee on contingent expenditures. In 1865 he was succeeded by Democrat Jared Thompson Jr.

References 

1810 births
Year of death missing
German emigrants to the United States
Politicians from Milwaukee
Wisconsin city council members
County supervisors in Wisconsin
Constables
Republican Party members of the Wisconsin State Assembly